Rivertown is an unincorporated community in Fulton County, in the U.S. state of Georgia.

History
The community was named for its riverside setting on the Chattahoochee River.

References

Unincorporated communities in Fulton County, Georgia
Unincorporated communities in Georgia (U.S. state)
Georgia populated places on the Chattahoochee River